The 2017 World RX of Norway was the sixth round of the fourth season of the FIA World Rallycross Championship. The event was held at the Lånkebanen near Hell, Nord-Trøndelag.

Supercar

Heats

Semi-finals
Semi-Final 1

Semi-Final 2

Finals

RX2 International Series

Heats

Semi-finals
Semi-Final 1

Semi-Final 2

Final

Standings after the event

Supercar standings

RX2 standings

 Note: Only the top five positions are included.

References

External links

|- style="text-align:center"
|width="35%"|Previous race:2017 World RX of Great Britain
|width="30%"|FIA World Rallycross Championship2017 season
|width="35%"|Next race:2017 World RX of Sweden
|- style="text-align:center"
|width="35%"|Previous race:2016 World RX of Norway
|width="30%"|World RX of Norway
|width="35%"|Next race:2018 World RX of Norway
|- style="text-align:center"

Norway
World RX
World RX